Omar Moussa (born 8 February 1961) is a Djiboutian long-distance runner who specializes in the marathon.

Moussa has competed at the Olympics twice, firstly at the 1988 Summer Olympics, where he finished 49th in the marathon, and then eight years later he again entered the Marathon at the 1996 Summer Olympics but he didn't finish the course.

References

1961 births
Living people
Djiboutian male marathon runners
Athletes (track and field) at the 1988 Summer Olympics
Athletes (track and field) at the 1996 Summer Olympics
Olympic athletes of Djibouti
Olympic male marathon runners